Garden Hill, also known as the Robert Cushen farmstead, is a historic home located at Hagerstown, Washington County, Maryland, United States. It was built about 1865, and is a two-story five-bay brick dwelling with a formal facade and a central entrance.  The house features Greek Revival detailing, with some Gothic Revival influence in interior trim.

It was listed on the National Register of Historic Places in 2002.

References

External links
, including photo from 2001, at Maryland Historical Trust

Farms on the National Register of Historic Places in Maryland
Houses completed in 1865
Greek Revival houses in Maryland
Houses in Hagerstown, Maryland
National Register of Historic Places in Washington County, Maryland